Hyloniscus is a genus of crustaceans belonging to the family Trichoniscidae.

The species of this genus are found in Europe and Northern America.

Species:
 Hyloniscus adonis Verhoeff, 1927
 Hyloniscus beckeri Herold, 1939

References

Woodlice
Isopod genera